Electoral district of Eaglehawk was an electoral district of the Legislative Assembly in the Australian state of Victoria.  It was created by the Electoral Act Amendment Act 1888, taking effect at the 1889 elections. 
It was abolished by the Electoral Districts Act 1926 
(taking effect at the 1927 elections) when several new districts were created.

Members for Eaglehawk

Election results

References

Former electoral districts of Victoria (Australia)
1889 establishments in Australia
1927 disestablishments in Australia